M. Krishnappa (14 April 1918 – 7 February 1984) was an Indian politician from the state of Karnataka.

Personal life 
He was born on 14 April 1918 in a farming family. Horticulture was his profession and Agriculture was his hobby. He stayed at No. 15, Lalbagh Road, Bangalore. He earned a BSc Graduate from Bangalore University. He was a Senate Member at Rajiv Gandhi the University of Health Science, Karnataka. He died on 7 February 1984.

Career 
He supported Congress Party since 1942 and joined the Party in 1950. Later he was elected unopposed to the Bangalore City Corporation. He was elected as chairman of the Works Committee for 2 years from 1955. Becoming the first citizen of Bangalore was a dream come true moment for Krishnappa in 1956 and remained in the post for a year. He became a Member of Mysore Pradesh Congress Committee in 1960. He was later elected to the Mysore Legislative Assembly from Basavangudi Constituency in 1962 Mysore Legislative Assembly elections. He was nominated as President of Bangalore City District Congress Committee (BCDCC) in 1964, for a tenure of 3 years, later elevated as member of All India Congress Committee. He was made a member of Mysore Legislative Council in 1967 for a term of 3 years.

References

External links
Karnataka Legislative Assembly

1918 births
1984 deaths
Mayors of Bangalore
Indian National Congress politicians from Karnataka
Mysore MLAs 1962–1967
Mysore MLAs 1967–1972